Liu Cunxin (1926 – 15 July 2020) was a lieutenant general (zhongjiang) of the People's Liberation Army (PLA). He was a representative of the 13th National Congress of the Chinese Communist Party. He was a delegate to the 4th National People's Congress. He was a member of the National Committee of the 8th Chinese People's Political Consultative Conference.

Biography
Liu was born in Qingyun County, Shandong, in 1926. He enlisted in the Eighth Route Army in January 1938, and joined the Chinese Communist Party (CCP) in March 1939. He participated in the Second Sino-Japanese War. 
He became political commissar of the Air Force of Shenyang Military Region in January 1986, and served until January 1993. He attained the rank of lieutenant general (zhongjiang) in 1988. On 15 July 2020, he died of an illness in Beijing, at the age of 94.

Personal life 
His elder brother Liu Cunzhi was also a lieutenant general (zhongjiang) of the People's Liberation Army (PLA).

References

1926 births
2020 deaths
People from Qingyun County
People's Liberation Army generals from Shandong
People's Republic of China politicians from Shandong
Chinese Communist Party politicians from Shandong
Delegates to the 4th National People's Congress
Members of the 8th Chinese People's Political Consultative Conference